Musa zaifui is a species of plant in the banana family native to temperate China (Yunnan province).

References

zaifui
Plants described in 2008
Endemic flora of Yunnan